Jinxi County is a county of Jiangxi province in the People's Republic of China. It is under the jurisdiction of the prefecture-level city of Fuzhou.

Jinxi is the hometown of Lu Xiangshan, a famous educator and thinker in the Southern Song Dynasty. He was highly honored in Chinese history as well as one of China's top ten thinkers. Jinxi has nurtured many famous figures, including Wei Su, a famous historian in the Yuan Dynasty, Gong Tingxian, a great medical scientist in the Ming Dynasty and Cai Shangxiang, an outstanding scholar in the Qing Dynasty. Zhou Jianping, the commander of the Red Tenth Army and one of the founders of Mingzhegan Revolution Base, also came from Jinxi. It has boasted two zhuangyuan, three bangyan and 242 jinshi since Jinxi County was founded.

Jinxi is the core zone of Linchuan culture as well as part and parcel of Gan culture. Jinxi County was founded in the fifth year of Chunhua of the Northern Song Dynasty (994 CE). Renowned for its important silver smelting site in the Tang Dynasty, the output of gold and silver in the ancient time and the golden streams running through the mountains, it was named Jinxi (golden stream). Some silver smelting relic sites and relevant inscriptions which were the earliest physically written record in ancient China's mining and metallurgy have still remained in the county. It used to be an important pottery and porcelain production base in the Song Dynasty, so a folk saying goes, "First Xiaopi Kiln, then Jingdezhen."

Administrative divisions
In the present, Jinxi County has 7 towns and 6 townships.
7 towns

6 townships

Demographics 
The population of the district was 605,100 as of 2010.

Climate

Notes and references

External links
  Government site  - English version

 
County-level divisions of Jiangxi
Fuzhou, Jiangxi